Us Against the World is the debut studio album by Swedish girl group Play, released on 12 December 2001. In the United States, it was released on 25 June 2002 as the self-titled EP Play. The album charted on the Billboard 200, peaking at number 74 on 5 October 2002, and on 24 March 2003 the album was certified Gold by the RIAA. The songs "Us Against the World" and "Cinderella" were released as singles.

Track listing

EP

Personnel
Faye Hamlin (lead vocals)
Anaïs Lameche (lead vocals)
Anna Sundstrand (backing vocals)
Rosie Munter (backing vocals)

Charts

References

2001 debut albums
2002 debut albums
Play (Swedish group) albums
Albums produced by Ric Wake